= Nordiska sällskapet i London =

The Nordiska sällskapet i London ('Nordic London Society') was founded by Danes, Norwegians and Swedes residing in London in 1784. Its purpose was to "work in the service of the Nordic literature, economy, trade science and the free arts, in addition to keep in between them their own mother tongue in this foreign nation." The society served as a meeting place for Nordic expatriates in London regardless of social status, and the Nordic envoys and ambassadors in London attended to the annual jubilee the first Thursday of each year and at special national events.
